Glen Campbell's Twenty Golden Greats was Glen Campbell's biggest selling album in the UK, reaching the top of the UK Albums Chart and staying on the chart for 27 weeks.

Track listing
Side 1:

 "Rhinestone Cowboy" (Larry Weiss)
 "Both Sides Now" (Joni Mitchell)
 "By the Time I Get to Phoenix" (Jimmy Webb)
 "Gentle on My Mind" (John Hartford)
 "Too Many Mornings" (Place)
 "Wichita Lineman" (Jimmy Webb)
 "One Last Time" (D. & D. Addrisi)
 "Don't Pull Your Love/Then You Can Tell Me Goodbye" (Dennis Lambert, Brian Potter, John D. Loudermilk)
 "Reason to Believe" (Tim Hardin)
 "It's Only Make Believe" (Conway Twitty, Jack Nance)

Side 2:

 "Honey Come Back" (Jimmy Webb)
 "Give Me Back That Old Familiar Feeling" (Billy C. Graham)
 "Galveston" (Jimmy Webb)
 "Dreams of the Everyday Housewife" (Chris Gantry)
 "The Last Thing on My Mind" (Paxton)
 "Where's the Playground Susie" (Jimmy Webb)
 "Try a Little Kindness" (Sapaugh, Austin)
 "Country Boy (You Got Your Feet In L.A.) (Dennis Lambert, Brian Potter)
 "All I Have to Do Is Dream" (Boudleaux Bryant) with Bobbie Gentry
 "Amazing Grace" (John Newton)

Production
"By the Time I Get to Phoenix", "Gentle on My Mind", "Wichita Lineman", "Reason to Believe", "Galveston", "Dreams of the Everyday Housewife", "Where's the Playground Susie" courtesy of Ember Records
Distributed by Capitol/EMI Records
Made in Great Britain
Illustrated by Paul Allen

Charts
Album

1976 greatest hits albums
Glen Campbell compilation albums